Tennessine is a synthetic chemical element with the symbol Ts and atomic number 117. It is the second-heaviest known element and the penultimate element of the 7th period of the periodic table.

The discovery of tennessine was officially announced in Dubna, Russia, by a Russian–American collaboration in April 2010, which makes it the most recently discovered element . One of its daughter isotopes was created directly in 2011, partially confirming the results of the experiment. The experiment itself was repeated successfully by the same collaboration in 2012 and by a joint German–American team in May 2014. In December 2015, the Joint Working Party of the International Union of Pure and Applied Chemistry (IUPAC) and the International Union of Pure and Applied Physics (IUPAP), which evaluates claims of discovery of new elements, recognized the element and assigned the priority to the Russian–American team. In June 2016, the IUPAC published a declaration stating that the discoverers had suggested the name tennessine after Tennessee, United States, a name which was officially adopted in November 2016.

Tennessine may be located in the "island of stability", a concept that explains why some superheavy elements are more stable compared to an overall trend of decreasing stability for elements beyond bismuth on the periodic table. The synthesized tennessine atoms have lasted tens and hundreds of milliseconds. In the periodic table, tennessine is expected to be a member of group 17, the halogens. Some of its properties may differ significantly from those of the lighter halogens due to relativistic effects. As a result, tennessine is expected to be a volatile metal that neither forms anions nor achieves high oxidation states. A few key properties, such as its melting and boiling points and its first ionization energy, are nevertheless expected to follow the periodic trends of the halogens.

Introduction

History

Pre-discovery
In December 2004, the Joint Institute for Nuclear Research (JINR) team in Dubna, Moscow Oblast, Russia, proposed a joint experiment with the Oak Ridge National Laboratory (ORNL) in Oak Ridge, Tennessee, United States, to synthesize element 117 — so called for the 117 protons in its nucleus. Their proposal involved fusing a berkelium (element 97) target and a calcium (element 20) beam, conducted via bombardment of the berkelium target with calcium nuclei: this would complete a set of experiments done at the JINR on the fusion of actinide targets with a calcium-48 beam, which had thus far produced the new elements 113–116 and 118. The ORNL—then the world's only producer of berkelium—could not then provide the element, as they had temporarily ceased production, and re-initiating it would be too costly. Plans to synthesize element 117 were suspended in favor of the confirmation of element 118, which had been produced earlier in 2002 by bombarding a californium target with calcium. The required berkelium-249 is a by-product in californium-252 production, and obtaining the required amount of berkelium was an even more difficult task than obtaining that of californium, as well as costly: It would cost around 3.5 million dollars, and the parties agreed to wait for a commercial order of californium production, from which berkelium could be extracted.

The JINR team sought to use berkelium because calcium-48, the isotope of calcium used in the beam, has 20 protons and 28 neutrons, making a neutron–proton ratio of 1.4; and it is the lightest stable or near-stable nucleus with such a large neutron excess. The second-lightest such nucleus, palladium-110 (46 protons, 64 neutrons, neutron–proton ratio of 1.391), is much heavier. Thanks to the neutron excess, the resulting nuclei were expected to be heavier and closer to the sought-after island of stability. Of the aimed for 117 protons, calcium has 20, and thus they needed to use berkelium, which has 97 protons in its nucleus.

In February 2005, the leader of the JINR team — Yuri Oganessian — presented a colloquium at ORNL. Also in attendance were representatives of Lawrence Livermore National Laboratory, who had previously worked with JINR on the discovery of elements 113–116 and 118, and Joseph Hamilton of Vanderbilt University, a collaborator of Oganessian.

Hamilton checked if the ORNL high-flux reactor produced californium for a commercial order: The required berkelium could be obtained as a by-product. He learned that it did not and there was no expectation for such an order in the immediate future. Hamilton kept monitoring the situation, making the checks once in a while. (Later, Oganessian referred to Hamilton as "the father of 117" for doing this work.)

Discovery
ORNL resumed californium production in spring 2008. Hamilton noted the restart during the summer and made a deal on subsequent extraction of berkelium (the price was about $600,000). During a September 2008 symposium at Vanderbilt University in Nashville, Tennessee celebrating his 50th year on the Physics faculty, he introduced Oganessian to James Roberto (then the deputy director for science and technology at ORNL). They established a collaboration among JINR, ORNL, and Vanderbilt; the team at the Lawrence Livermore National Laboratory (LLNL) in Livermore, California, U.S., was soon invited to join.
In November 2008, the U.S. Department of Energy, which had oversight over the reactor in Oak Ridge, allowed the scientific use of the extracted berkelium. The production lasted 250 days and ended in late December 2008, resulting in 22 milligrams of berkelium, enough to perform the experiment. In January 2009, the berkelium was removed from ORNL's High Flux Isotope Reactor; it was subsequently cooled for 90 days and then processed at ORNL's Radiochemical Engineering and Development Center to separate and purify the berkelium material, which took another 90 days. Its half-life is only 330 days: after that time, half the berkelium produced would have decayed. Because of this, the berkelium target had to be quickly transported to Russia; for the experiment to be viable, it had to be completed within six months of its departure from the United States. The target was packed into five lead containers to be flown from New York to Moscow.

Russian customs officials twice refused to let the target enter the country because of missing or incomplete paperwork. Over the span of a few days, the target traveled over the Atlantic Ocean five times. On its arrival in Russia in June 2009, the berkelium was immediately transferred to Research Institute of Atomic Reactors (RIAR) in Dimitrovgrad, Ulyanovsk Oblast, where it was deposited as a 300-nanometer-thin layer on a titanium film. In July 2009, it was transported to Dubna, where it was installed in the particle accelerator at the JINR. The calcium-48 beam was generated by chemically extracting the small quantities of calcium-48 present in naturally occurring calcium, enriching it 500 times. This work was done in the closed town of Lesnoy, Sverdlovsk Oblast, Russia.

The experiment began in late July 2009. In January 2010, scientists at the Flerov Laboratory of Nuclear Reactions announced internally that they had detected the decay of a new element with atomic number 117 via two decay chains: one of an odd–odd isotope undergoing 6 alpha decays before spontaneous fission, and one of an odd–even isotope undergoing 3 alpha decays before fission. The obtained data from the experiment was sent to the LLNL for further analysis. On 9 April 2010, an official report was released in the journal Physical Review Letters identifying the isotopes as 294117 and 293117, which were shown to have half-lives on the order of tens or hundreds of milliseconds. The work was signed by all parties involved in the experiment to some extent: JINR, ORNL, LLNL, RIAR, Vanderbilt, the University of Tennessee (Knoxville, Tennessee, U.S.), and the University of Nevada (Las Vegas, Nevada, U.S.), which provided data analysis support. The isotopes were formed as follows:

 +  → 297117* → 294117 + 3  (1 event)

 +  → 297117* → 293117 + 4  (5 events)

Confirmation 

All daughter isotopes (decay products) of element 117 were previously unknown; therefore, their properties could not be used to confirm the claim of discovery. In 2011, when one of the decay products (115) was synthesized directly, its properties matched those measured in the claimed indirect synthesis from the decay of element 117. The discoverers did not submit a claim for their findings in 2007–2011 when the Joint Working Party was reviewing claims of discoveries of new elements.

The Dubna team repeated the experiment in 2012, creating seven atoms of element 117 and confirming their earlier synthesis of element 118 (produced after some time when a significant quantity of the berkelium-249 target had beta decayed to californium-249). The results of the experiment matched the previous outcome; the scientists then filed an application to register the element. In May 2014, a joint German–American collaboration of scientists from the ORNL and the GSI Helmholtz Center for Heavy Ion Research in Darmstadt, Hessen, Germany, claimed to have confirmed discovery of the element. The team repeated the Dubna experiment using the Darmstadt accelerator, creating two atoms of element 117.

In December 2015, the JWP officially recognized the discovery of 293117 on account of the confirmation of the properties of its daughter 115, and thus the listed discoverers — JINR, LLNL, and ORNL — were given the right to suggest an official name for the element. (Vanderbilt was left off the initial list of discoverers in an error that was later corrected.)

In May 2016, Lund University (Lund, Scania, Sweden) and GSI cast some doubt on the syntheses of elements 115 and 117. The decay chains assigned to 115, the isotope instrumental in the confirmation of the syntheses of elements 115 and 117, were found based on a new statistical method to be too different to belong to the same nuclide with a reasonably high probability. The reported 293117 decay chains approved as such by the JWP were found to require splitting into individual data sets assigned to different isotopes of element 117. It was also found that the claimed link between the decay chains reported as from 117 and 115 probably did not exist. (On the other hand, the chains from the non-approved isotope 117 were found to be congruent.) The multiplicity of states found when nuclides that are not even–even undergo alpha decay is not unexpected and contributes to the lack of clarity in the cross-reactions. This study criticized the JWP report for overlooking subtleties associated with this issue, and considered it "problematic" that the only argument for the acceptance of the discoveries of elements 115 and 117 was a link they considered to be doubtful.

On 8 June 2017, two members of the Dubna team published a journal article answering these criticisms, analysing their data on the nuclides 117 and 115 with widely accepted statistical methods, noted that the 2016 studies indicating non-congruence produced problematic results when applied to radioactive decay: they excluded from the 90% confidence interval both average and extreme decay times, and the decay chains that would be excluded from the 90% confidence interval they chose were more probable to be observed than those that would be included. The 2017 reanalysis concluded that the observed decay chains of 117 and 115 were consistent with the assumption that only one nuclide was present at each step of the chain, although it would be desirable to be able to directly measure the mass number of the originating nucleus of each chain as well as the excitation function of the  reaction.

Naming 

Using Mendeleev's nomenclature for unnamed and undiscovered elements, element 117 should be known as eka-astatine. Using the 1979 recommendations by the International Union of Pure and Applied Chemistry (IUPAC), the element was temporarily called ununseptium (symbol Uus) until its discovery was confirmed and a permanent name chosen; the temporary name was formed from Latin roots "one", "one", and "seven", a reference to the element's atomic number 117. Many scientists in the field called it "element 117", with the symbol E117, (117), or 117. According to guidelines of IUPAC valid at the moment of the discovery approval, the permanent names of new elements should have ended in "-ium"; this included element 117, even if the element was a halogen, which traditionally have names ending in "-ine"; however, the new recommendations published in 2016 recommended using the "-ine" ending for all new group 17 elements.

After the original synthesis in 2010, Dawn Shaughnessy of LLNL and Oganessian declared that naming was a sensitive question, and it was avoided as far as possible. However, Hamilton declared that year, "I was crucial in getting the group together and in getting the 249Bk target essential for the discovery. As a result of that, I'm going to get to name the element. I can't tell you the name, but it will bring distinction to the region." (Hamilton teaches at Vanderbilt University in Nashville, Tennessee, U.S.) In a 2015 interview, Oganessian, after telling the story of the experiment, said, "and the Americans named this a tour de force, they had demonstrated they could do [this] with no margin for error. Well, soon they will name the 117th element."

In March 2016, the discovery team agreed on a conference call involving representatives from the parties involved on the name "tennessine" for element 117. In June 2016, IUPAC published a declaration stating the discoverers had submitted their suggestions for naming the new elements 115, 117, and 118 to the IUPAC; the suggestion for the element 117 was tennessine, with a symbol of Ts, after "the region of Tennessee". The suggested names were recommended for acceptance by the IUPAC Inorganic Chemistry Division; formal acceptance was set to occur after a five-month term following publishing of the declaration expires. In November 2016, the names, including tennessine, were formally accepted. Concerns that the proposed symbol Ts may clash with a notation for the tosyl group used in organic chemistry were rejected, following existing symbols bearing such dual meanings: Ac (actinium and acetyl) and Pr (praseodymium and propyl). The naming ceremony for moscovium, tennessine, and oganesson was held on 2 March 2017 at the Russian Academy of Sciences in Moscow; a separate ceremony for tennessine alone had been held at ORNL in January 2017.

Predicted properties 
Other than nuclear properties, no properties of tennessine or its compounds have been measured; this is due to its extremely limited and expensive production and the fact that it decays very quickly. Properties of tennessine remain unknown and only predictions are available.

Nuclear stability and isotopes 

The stability of nuclei quickly decreases with the increase in atomic number after curium, element 96, whose half-life is four orders of magnitude longer than that of any subsequent element. All isotopes with an atomic number above 101 undergo radioactive decay with half-lives of less than 30 hours. No elements with atomic numbers above 82 (after lead) have stable isotopes. This is because of the ever-increasing Coulomb repulsion of protons, so that the strong nuclear force cannot hold the nucleus together against spontaneous fission for long. Calculations suggest that in the absence of other stabilizing factors, elements with more than 104 protons should not exist. However, researchers in the 1960s suggested that the closed nuclear shells around 114 protons and 184 neutrons should counteract this instability, creating an "island of stability" where nuclides could have half-lives reaching thousands or millions of years. While scientists have still not reached the island, the mere existence of the superheavy elements (including tennessine) confirms that this stabilizing effect is real, and in general the known superheavy nuclides become exponentially longer-lived as they approach the predicted location of the island. Tennessine is the second-heaviest element created so far, and all its known isotopes have half-lives of less than one second. Nevertheless, this is longer than the values predicted prior to their discovery: the predicted lifetimes for 293Ts and 294Ts used in the discovery paper were 10 ms and 45 ms respectively, while the observed lifetimes were 21 ms and 112 ms respectively. The Dubna team believes that the synthesis of the element is direct experimental proof of the existence of the island of stability.

It has been calculated that the isotope 295Ts would have a half-life of about 18 milliseconds, and it may be possible to produce this isotope via the same berkelium–calcium reaction used in the discoveries of the known isotopes, 293Ts and 294Ts. The chance of this reaction producing 295Ts is estimated to be, at most, one-seventh the chance of producing 294Ts. Calculations using a quantum tunneling model predict the existence of several isotopes of tennessine up to 303Ts. The most stable of these is expected to be 296Ts with an alpha-decay half-life of 40 milliseconds. A liquid drop model study on the element's isotopes shows similar results; it suggests a general trend of increasing stability for isotopes heavier than 301Ts, with partial half-lives exceeding the age of the universe for the heaviest isotopes like 335Ts when beta decay is not considered. Lighter isotopes of tennessine may be produced in the 243Am+50Ti reaction, which was considered as a contingency plan by the Dubna team in 2008 if 249Bk proved unavailable. It was considered again for study in 2017–2018 to investigate the properties of nuclear reactions with a titanium-50 beam, which becomes necessary to synthesize elements beyond oganesson.

Atomic and physical
However, going down group 17, the metallicity of the elements increases; for example, iodine already exhibits a metallic luster in the solid state, and astatine is expected to be a metal. As such, an extrapolation based on periodic trends would predict tennessine to be a rather volatile metal.

Calculations have confirmed the accuracy of this simple extrapolation, although experimental verification of this is currently impossible as the half-lives of the known tennessine isotopes are too short. Significant differences between tennessine and the previous halogens are likely to arise, largely due to spin–orbit interaction—the mutual interaction between the motion and spin of electrons. The spin–orbit interaction is especially strong for the superheavy elements because their electrons move faster—at velocities comparable to the speed of light—than those in lighter atoms. In tennessine atoms, this lowers the 7s and the 7p electron energy levels, stabilizing the corresponding electrons, although two of the 7p electron energy levels are more stabilized than the other four. The stabilization of the 7s electrons is called the inert pair effect; the effect that separates the 7p subshell into the more-stabilized and the less-stabilized parts is called subshell splitting. Computational chemists understand the split as a change of the second (azimuthal) quantum number l from 1 to 1/2 and 3/2 for the more-stabilized and less-stabilized parts of the 7p subshell, respectively.

Differences for other electron levels also exist. For example, the 6d electron levels (also split in two, with four being 6d3/2 and six being 6d5/2) are both raised, so they are close in energy to the 7s ones, although no 6d electron chemistry has been predicted for tennessine. The difference between the 7p1/2 and 7p3/2 levels is abnormally high; 9.8 eV. Astatine's 6p subshell split is only 3.8 eV, and its 6p1/2 chemistry has already been called "limited". These effects cause tennessine's chemistry to differ from those of its upper neighbors (see below).

Tennessine's first ionization energy—the energy required to remove an electron from a neutral atom—is predicted to be 7.7 eV, lower than those of the halogens, again following the trend. Like its neighbors in the periodic table, tennessine is expected to have the lowest electron affinity—energy released when an electron is added to the atom—in its group; 2.6 or 1.8 eV. The electron of the hypothetical hydrogen-like tennessine atom—oxidized so it has only one electron, Ts116+—is predicted to move so quickly that its mass is 1.90 times that of a non-moving electron, a feature attributable to relativistic effects. For comparison, the figure for hydrogen-like astatine is 1.27 and the figure for hydrogen-like iodine is 1.08. Simple extrapolations of relativity laws indicate a contraction of atomic radius. Advanced calculations show that the radius of an tennessine atom that has formed one covalent bond would be 165 pm, while that of astatine would be 147 pm. With the seven outermost electrons removed, tennessine is finally smaller; 57 pm for tennessine and 61 pm for astatine.

The melting and boiling points of tennessine are not known; earlier papers predicted about 350–500 °C and 550 °C, respectively, or 350–550 °C and 610 °C, respectively. These values exceed those of astatine and the lighter halogens, following periodic trends. A later paper predicts the boiling point of tennessine to be 345 °C (that of astatine is estimated as 309 °C, 337 °C, or 370 °C, although experimental values of 230 °C and 411 °C have been reported). The density of tennessine is expected to be between 7.1 and 7.3 g/cm3.

Chemical 

The known isotopes of tennessine, 293Ts and 294Ts, are too short-lived to allow for chemical experimentation at present. Nevertheless, many chemical properties of tennessine have been calculated. Unlike the lighter group 17 elements, tennessine may not exhibit the chemical behavior common to the halogens. For example, fluorine, chlorine, bromine, and iodine routinely accept an electron to achieve the more stable electronic configuration of a noble gas, obtaining eight electrons (octet) in their valence shells instead of seven. This ability weakens as atomic weight increases going down the group; tennessine would be the least willing group 17 element to accept an electron. Of the oxidation states it is predicted to form, −1 is expected to be the least common. The standard reduction potential of the Ts/Ts− couple is predicted to be −0.25 V; this value is negative, unlike for all the lighter halogens.

There is another opportunity for tennessine to complete its octet—by forming a covalent bond. Like the halogens, when two tennessine atoms meet they are expected to form a Ts–Ts bond to give a diatomic molecule. Such molecules are commonly bound via single sigma bonds between the atoms; these are different from pi bonds, which are divided into two parts, each shifted in a direction perpendicular to the line between the atoms, and opposite one another rather than being located directly between the atoms they bind. Sigma bonding has been calculated to show a great antibonding character in the At2 molecule and is not as favorable energetically. Tennessine is predicted to continue the trend; a strong pi character should be seen in the bonding of Ts2. The molecule tennessine chloride (TsCl) is predicted to go further, being bonded with a single pi bond.

Aside from the unstable −1 state, three more oxidation states are predicted; +5, +3, and +1. The +1 state should be especially stable because of the destabilization of the three outermost 7p3/2 electrons, forming a stable, half-filled subshell configuration; astatine shows similar effects. The +3 state should be important, again due to the destabilized 7p3/2 electrons. The +5 state is predicted to be uncommon because the 7p1/2 electrons are oppositely stabilized. The +7 state has not been shown—even computationally—to be achievable. Because the 7s electrons are greatly stabilized, it has been hypothesized that tennessine effectively has only five valence electrons.

The simplest possible tennessine compound would be the monohydride, TsH. The bonding is expected to be provided by a 7p3/2 electron of tennessine and the 1s electron of hydrogen. The non-bonding nature of the 7p1/2 spinor is because tennessine is expected not to form purely sigma or pi bonds. Therefore, the destabilized (thus expanded) 7p3/2 spinor is responsible for bonding. This effect lengthens the TsH molecule by 17 picometers compared with the overall length of 195 pm. Since the tennessine p electron bonds are two-thirds sigma, the bond is only two-thirds as strong as it would be if tennessine featured no spin–orbit interactions. The molecule thus follows the trend for halogen hydrides, showing an increase in bond length and a decrease in dissociation energy compared to AtH. The molecules TlTs and NhTs may be viewed analogously, taking into account an opposite effect shown by the fact that the element's p1/2 electrons are stabilized. These two characteristics result in a relatively small dipole moment (product of difference between electric charges of atoms and displacement of the atoms) for TlTs; only 1.67 D, the positive value implying that the negative charge is on the tennessine atom. For NhTs, the strength of the effects are predicted to cause a transfer of the electron from the tennessine atom to the nihonium atom, with the dipole moment value being −1.80 D. The spin–orbit interaction increases the dissociation energy of the TsF molecule because it lowers the electronegativity of tennessine, causing the bond with the extremely electronegative fluorine atom to have a more ionic character. Tennessine monofluoride should feature the strongest bonding of all group 17 monofluorides.

VSEPR theory predicts a bent-T-shaped molecular geometry for the group 17 trifluorides. All known halogen trifluorides have this molecular geometry and have a structure of AX3E2—a central atom, denoted A, surrounded by three ligands, X, and two unshared electron pairs, E. If relativistic effects are ignored, TsF3 should follow its lighter congeners in having a bent-T-shaped molecular geometry. More sophisticated predictions show that this molecular geometry would not be energetically favored for TsF3, predicting instead a trigonal planar molecular geometry (AX3E0). This shows that VSEPR theory may not be consistent for the superheavy elements. The TsF3 molecule is predicted to be significantly stabilized by spin–orbit interactions; a possible rationale may be the large difference in electronegativity between tennessine and fluorine, giving the bond a partially ionic character.

Notes

References

Bibliography 

 
 
 
 
 
 
 
 
 

 
Chemical elements
Halogens
Science and technology in Tennessee
Synthetic elements